The Southern League has operated primarily in the Southern United States since 1964. For the 2021 season, the league was named the Double-A South before switching back to its previous moniker in 2022. Over that -season span, its teams relocated, changed names, transferred to different leagues, or ceased operations altogether. This list documents teams which played in the league.

Teams

Map

See also

List of Eastern League teams
List of Texas League teams
List of Southern League stadiums

References

External links

 
Southern League teams
Southern League